Raniganj is a neighbourhood in Asansol, West Bengal, India.

Raniganj may also refer to:

In West Bengal
 Raniganj (community development block), West Bengal
 Raniganj, West Bengal Assembly constituency, West Bengal

In Bihar
 Raniganj, Araria town in Bihar
 Raniganj, Araria (community development block) Bihar community development block
 Raniganj, Bihar Assembly constituency, Bihar, India

In 
 Raniganj, Gonda, a village in Gonda district of Uttar Pradesh, India
 Raniganj, Pratapgarh district in Uttar Pradesh
 Raniganj, Uttar Pradesh Assembly constituency in Pratapgarh district
 Ranigunj, Amethi district, a town in Amethi district, Uttar Pradesh 

Other places
 Rani Gunj, a neighbourhood in Secunderabad, Telangana, India
 Raniganj, Nepal, a village development committee in Sarlahi District in the Janakpur Zone of south-eastern Nepal